Gioele Del Giudice (born 7 March 2000) is an Italian footballer who plays as a forward for Serie C side Pro Piacenza.

Career statistics

Notes

References

2000 births
Living people
Italian footballers
Association football forwards
Udinese Calcio players
A.S. Pro Piacenza 1919 players
Serie C players